Prionapteryx flavipars is a moth in the family Crambidae. It was described by George Hampson in 1919. It is found in Zimbabwe.

References

Endemic fauna of Zimbabwe
Ancylolomiini
Moths described in 1919